Nekocon is an annual three-day anime convention held traditionally on the first weekend in November at the Hampton Roads Convention Center in Hampton, Virginia. It is Virginia's oldest anime convention. The convention's name comes from the Japanese word , meaning "cat".

Programming
The convention typically offers art shows, artist's alley, autograph sessions, card game tournaments, charity auction, concerts, costume competition, dances, dealer's room, fashion show, karaoke contests, kimono/tea ceremony workshop, maid cafe, music video contest, panels, Q&A sessions, role playing, tabletop games, vendors, video game tournaments, video rooms, and workshops. Nekocon's 2015 charity events benefited Be The Match.

History
An attendance cap of 1,600 passes was instituted in 2003 due to fire code regulations. The convention held its first J-rock concert in 2009, hosting Suicide Ali. Virginia Air and Space Center provided content during the 2012 convention. Nekocon in 2017 had an Anime style cooking challenge with students from the Culinary Institute of Virginia. Nekocon 2020 was cancelled due to the COVID-19 pandemic.

Event history

References

External links

Anime conventions in the United States
Recurring events established in 1998
1998 establishments in Virginia
Annual events in Virginia
Festivals in Virginia
Culture of Hampton, Virginia
Tourist attractions in Hampton, Virginia
Conventions in Virginia